The Hobby Horse is a 1962 Australian television play which aired on ABC. Broadcast live, it was a drama set on a grazing property in northern New South Wales about a rodeo rider.

Australian TV drama was relatively rare at the time. It was one of a series of six Australian plays produced by the ABC in 1962. The others were:
Boy Round the Corner
The House of Mancello
Funnel Web
The Teeth of the Wind
Jenny

Plot
Billy Brocknell gets a job breaking horses on a large property. His former wife, Margaret, is now married to the older property owner. The two meet for the first time since their marriage was annulled by their parents.

Cast
Wynn Roberts - Billy
Lynn Flanagan - Margaret
Ken Goodlet
Douglas Kelly
Neil Curnow
Bill Bennett
Rose Du Clos
Carole Potter
Ron Pinnell
David Mitchell
Beris Sullivan

Production
It was written by Robert Wales, a Scotsman who had worked for a number of years in Australia. Wales recently won the Coffs Harbour play competition. Wales said he got the idea from two professional horsebreakers he met at a pub in Walcha.

Reception
The TV critic for The Bulletin called it:
Drama with out cause. The horsebreaker came to the station and found his former wife in residence. He had the alternative of leaving immediately, like any sensible man, or grabbing her back. Instead, he was given the task of appearing to want her and yet not want her, to be going to leave and yet not leaving. An hour of soul-searching by people who did not know their own minds for more than one minute at a time. It could have been cabled, with apologies to Sidney Kingsley, "They Knew Not What They Wanted”.

References

External links

1962 television films
1962 films
Australian television films
Australian Broadcasting Corporation original programming
English-language television shows
Black-and-white Australian television shows
Australian live television shows
Films directed by William Sterling (director)